Dobong-dong is a dong, a neighbourhood of Dobong-gu in Seoul, South Korea.  The dong is one of the four located in the Dobong District. According to the Köppen–Geiger climate classification system, the region is Dwa, or a humid continental climate. The average temperature is 11.1°C and approximately 147.5 cm of precipitation falls annually. The postal code for Dobong-dong is 132-010. The region is also referred to as Tobong-dong.

In popular culture 

Strong Girl Bong-soon, one of the highest rated Korean dramas in cable television, takes place here. The main character's name, Do Bong-soon (of Dobong-dong, Dobong-gu), is a play on words on the region.

See also 

Administrative divisions of South Korea

References

External links
Dobong-gu map
Dongbong-dong on Mapcarta
Dongbong-dong on OpenStreetMap

Neighbourhoods of Dobong District